Chris Knight is the debut album from country music singer and songwriter Chris Knight. It was released on February 10, 1998 by Decca Nashville. Singles from it were "Framed" and "It Ain't Easy Being Me", although neither charted. "The Hammer Going Down" also appeared on the soundtrack of the 1998 film Black Dog, which was also released by Decca. The Road Hammers later covered the song on their 2005 self-titled debut album.

Track listing 
All songs written by Chris Knight except where noted.
 "It Ain't Easy Being Me" (Chris Knight, Craig Wiseman) – 3:32
 "Framed" – 3:48
 "Bring the Harvest Home" (Knight, Wiseman) – 4:10
 "Something Changed" – 4:14
 "House and 90 Acres" – 3:52
 "Summer of '75" (Knight, Sam Tate, Annie Tate) – 3:27
 "Run from Your Memory" (Knight, Tim Krekel) – 3:02
 "Love and a .45" (Knight, Fred Eaglesmith) – 3:14
 "The Hammer Going Down" (Knight, Dean Miller) – 5:30
 "The Band Is Playing Too Slow" – 3:59
 "The River's Own" (Knight, Gordon Bradberry) – 5:26
 "William" – 4:14

Personnel 
As listed in liner notes.
 Richard Bennett – acoustic guitar, electric guitar, hi-strung guitar, bouzouki, tiple
 Chad Cromwell – drums
 Eric Darken – percussion
 Dan Dugmore – acoustic guitar, electric guitar, steel guitar
 Glen Duncan – fiddle
 Kenny Greenberg – acoustic guitar, electric guitar, National guitar, fuzz pedal
 David Grissom – acoustic guitar, electric guitar
 Tony Harrell – mellotron, accordion, pump organ
 Chris Knight – vocals, acoustic guitar, electric guitar
 Tim Krekel – harmonica
 Phil Madiera – Hammond B-3 organ
 Marilyn Martin – background vocals
 Kenny Meeks – background vocals
 Russ Pahl – steel guitar
 Michael Rhodes – bass guitar
 Tammy Rogers – viola
 Christy Seamans – background vocals
 Glenn Worf – bass guitar

References 

1998 debut albums
Chris Knight (musician) albums
Decca Records albums
Albums produced by Frank Liddell
Albums produced by Greg Droman